Grit Boettcher (born 10 August 1938) is a German actress.

Early life 
In 1938, Boettcher was born in Berlin, Germany.

Career 
Boettcher is an actress in various films on German TV and in stage productions. Boettcher is sometimes credited in various spelling as Gritt Boettcher, Britt Böttcher, or Grit Böttcher.

Personal life 
Boettcher's second husband is Wolfgang Belstler. Boettcher has two children, Tristan Boettcher and Nicole Belstler-Boettcher.

Filmography

Film 
 (1958), as Renate Römer
Twelve Girls and One Man (1959), as Do
Guitars Sound Softly Through the Night (1959), as Eleanor
Carnival Confession (1960), as Bertel
Heaven, Love and Twine (1960), as Susanne Himmel
 (1960), as Elke
Freddy and the Millionaire (1961), as Edith Schmidt
He Can't Stop Doing It (1962), as Berenice
 (1962), as Wirtstochter
Love Has to Be Learned (1963), as Dora
The Black Abbot (1963), as Leslie Gine
Code Name: Jaguar (1965), as Saskia.
The Monk with the Whip (1967), as Betty Falks.
Death in the Red Jaguar (1968), as Linda Carp.
 (1968), as Christine.
 (1970), as Sabine Müller
Three Men in the Snow (1974), as Frau Casparius.
Der WiXXer (2004), as Miss Nora
8 Seconds (2015), as Mrs. Lobatski

Television 
Stahlnetz:  (1961, TV series episode), as Gisela Schintzel
So ein süßes kleines Biest (1964–1965, TV series, 13 episodes), as Georgie
Das Kriminalmuseum: Der Schlüssel (1964, TV series episode), as Maria
: Ein Auftrag für ...  (1966, TV series episode), as Marianne Melzer
 (1966, TV miniseries), as Jennifer Donegan
 (1968, TV miniseries), as Marion Klefisch
Bitte recht freundlich, es wird geschossen (1969, TV film), as Irene Grant
Ball im Savoy (1971, TV interpretation of operetta by Paul Abraham), as Daisy
Der Kommissar:  Überlegungen eines Mörders (1972, TV series episode), as Erika Taveller
Bleib wie du bist (1973, TV film), as Johanne Rieth
Ein verrücktes Paar (1977–1980, TV series, 10 episodes), in various roles
Leute wie du und ich (1980, TV series, 1 episode), as Mrs. Hauff
Wasser für die Blumen (1982, TV film), as Rose Torgau
Höchste Eisenbahn (1987, TV film), as Mrs. Reißenberg
Wartesaal zum kleinen Glück (1987–1990, TV series, 37 episodes), as Hanni Borgelt
Hotel Paradies (1989, TV series, 27 episodes), as Lisa Lindemann
Immer wieder Sonntag (1992–1996, TV series, 31 episodes), as Hilde Sonntag
Titus und der Fluch der Diamanten (1998, TV film), as Wanda
Die ProSieben Märchenstunde: Rotkäppchen – Wege zum Glück (2006, TV series episode), as Großmutter
Das Schneckenhaus (2006, TV film), as Rita Klee
Unser Kindermädchen ist ein Millionär (2006, TV film), as Martha
 (2006–2007, TV series, 27 episodes), as Ottilie Pankratz
Ein Fall für Nadja (2007, TV series, 6 episodes), as Irmgard Lay
Im Tal der wilden Rosen: Prüfung des Herzens (2007, TV series episode), as Nora
SOKO München: Die vergessenen Männer (2008, TV series episode), as Helga Neumann
Kleine Lüge für die Liebe (2008, TV film), as Emmy
Ein Haus voller Töchter (2010, TV series, 4 episodes), as Wilhelmina von Funke
Stuttgart Homicide: Entmündigt (2010, TV series episode), as Herta Pfleiderer
Hanna – Folge deinem Herzen (2010, TV series, 77 episodes), as Gitti Sommer
SOKO München: Ungesühnt (2012, TV series episode), as Mrs. Klausen
Rosa Roth: Der Schuss (2013, TV series episode), as Ursula Kage

References

Bibliography

External links 
 
 
 
 Grit Boettcher at fandango.com
 Grit Boettcher at agenturmosblech.de (in German)
 Belstler's daughter Nicole Belstler-Boettcher

German television actresses
German film actresses
German stage actresses
Actresses from Berlin
1938 births
Living people
20th-century German actresses
21st-century German actresses